The Journal of Molecular and Cellular Cardiology is a monthly peer-reviewed medical journal covering molecular and cellular aspects of cardiology. The journal was established in 1970 by Richard Bing and Lionel Opie and is published by Elsevier. It is the official journal of The International Society for Heart Research. The editor-in-chief is Rong Tian (University of Washington).  Previous editors-in-chief include:

Richard Bing & Lionel Opie (1970-1977)
Richard Bing (1978-1979)  
Lionel Opie, Cape Town, South Africa (1980-1986)
Arnold M. Katz, Farmington, CT, USA (1987-1992)
Norman Alpert, Burlington, VT, USA (1993-1998).
Richard Walsh, Cleveland, OH, USA (1999-2007)
David Eisner, Manchester, UK (2008-2016)
R. John Solaro, University of Illinois at Chicago (2017-2019)

Abstracting and indexing
The journal is abstracted and indexed in:

According to the Journal Citation Reports, the journal 2019 impact factor is 4.133.

References

External links

Cardiology journals
Elsevier academic journals
English-language journals
Monthly journals
Publications established in 1970